The Masaka–Mbarara Road is a road in the Central and Western Regions of Uganda, connecting the cities of Masaka in Masaka District, Central Region and Mbarara in Mbarara District, Western Region.

Location
The road improvements involved road extensions making the contract road length . The coordinates of the road west of the town of Lyantonde are 0°26'00.0"S, 31°05'40.0"E (Latitude:-0.433343; Longitude:31.094438).

Overview
Before 2008, the road had a bitumen surface in poor state. In 2008, the government of Uganda, using funds borrowed from the European Union, began upgrading the road to grade II bitumen surface with shoulders, culverts, and drainage channels. The work was contracted to Reynolds Construction Company of Nigeria, at a cost of Sh230 billion (approx.€79 or US$104 million at that time).

See also
 List of roads in Uganda

References

External links
Website of Uganda National Roads Authority

Roads in Uganda
Masaka District
Lwengo District
Lyantonde District
Kiruhura District
Mbarara District